Ruben Gukasovich Rubenov (1894 – 27 November 1937), also known as Ruben Mkrtichyan, was a Bolshevik revolutionary and Soviet politician who served as the 6th First Secretary of Azerbaijan Communist Party and revolutionary.

Early years and career
Rubenov was born in 1893 to an Armenian worker's family in Tiflis. In 1914, he joined the Bolshevik Party ranks. Before the Russian revolution of 1917, he was arrested several times for his revolutionary activities in Transcaucasia. On 7 February 1933 he was appointed the First Secretary of Azerbaijan SSR and served until 10 December that year, when he was replaced by Mir Jafar Baghirov. He was then appointed the Plenipotentiary of the Party Control Committee for the Kiev Oblast of Ukrainian SSR in 1934.

Arrest and execution
On 15 September 1937 he was arrested for "participation in terrorist activities" and sentenced to execution by firing squad by Military Tribunal. He was executed on 27 November 1937 at Butovo firing range. On 17 November 1954 he was posthumously rehabilitated by Military Collegium of the Supreme Court of the USSR.

References

1894 births
1937 deaths
Armenian atheists
Armenian communists
Armenian revolutionaries
Armenian people executed by the Soviet Union
First secretaries of the Azerbaijan Communist Party
Great Purge victims from Armenia
Members of the Communist Party of the Soviet Union executed by the Soviet Union
Politicians from Tbilisi
People from Tiflis Governorate
Soviet Armenians
Georgian people of Armenian descent
Soviet rehabilitations